Courthouse station may refer to:
Courthouse station (MBTA), an underground bus rapid transit station in Boston, Massachusetts
Courthouse station (San Diego Trolley), a light rail station in San Diego, California
Courthouse station (UTA), a light rail station in Salt Lake City, Utah
Pioneer Courthouse station, a light rail station in Portland, Oregon
Court House station, a Washington Metro station in Arlington, Virginia

See also
 Courthouse (disambiguation)